Vicente Javier Conelli González (born 7 January 2003) is a Chilean professional footballer who plays as a forward for Chilean Primera División club Unión Española.

Club career
As a child, Conelli was with Colo-Colo, Palestino, Escuela Gasco and Escuela Valle Grande and joined Unión Española youth system at the age of 8. He made his professional debut in a match against Universidad de Chile on February 6, 2021, and scored his first goal in a 2021 Copa Chile match against Deportes Puerto Montt on June 23 of  the same year.

International career
In December 2021, he represented Chile U20 at the friendly tournament Copa Rául Coloma Rivas, playing three matches and scoring a goal against Uruguay U20. In 2022, he took part in the friendly matches against Paraguay U20 and Peru U20. In 2023, he made four appearances and scored one goal in the South American U-20 Championship.

Personal life
As a child, he worked as ball boy in the Estadio Santa Laura and performed Hispanito (Little Spanish), the mascot of Unión Española.

References

External links
 
 Vicente Conelli at playmakerstats.com (English version of ceroacero.es)

2003 births
Living people
Footballers from Santiago
Chilean people of Italian descent
Chilean footballers
Chile under-20 international footballers
Association football forwards
Unión Española footballers
Chilean Primera División players